Aleksei Oktyabrinovich Balabanov  (25 February 1959 – 18 May 2013) was a Russian film director, screenwriter, and producer, a member of European Film Academy. He started from creating mostly arthouse pictures and music videos but gained significant mainstream popularity in action crime drama movies Brother (1997) and Brother 2 (2000), both of which starred Sergei Bodrov, Jr. Later, Balabanov directed the films Cargo 200 (2007), Morphine (2008) and A Stoker (2010) which also received critical recognition. He has been referred to as the "Russian Quentin Tarantino" in the press for his critically acclaimed yet controversial films.

Life and career
Aleksei Oktyabrinovich Balabanov was born on 25 February 1959, in Sverdlovsk (now Yekaterinburg).

In 1981 Balabanov graduated from Translation Department of the Gorky Pedagogical University of Foreign Languages. He then served in the Soviet Army as an officer-interpreter. After his discharge, from 1983 to 1987 he worked as an assistant film director at Sverdlovsk Film Studio. Balabanov shot his first film in 1987, in the Urals. The script of the film was written overnight. This low-budget work was filmed in a restaurant. Later Balabanov studied at the experimental workshop "Auteur Cinema" (Russian: Авторское кино) of the High Courses for Scriptwriters and Film Directors, graduating in 1990.

Starting from 1990 Balabanov lived and worked in St. Petersburg.

In 1991 Balabanov directed his feature film debut Happy Days based on the works by Samuel Beckett. It was screened at the Cannes Film Festival in 1994. In 1994 Balabanov together with Sergey Selyanov and Viktor Sergeyev founded the production company CTV. The same year he directed the Franz Kafka adaptation The Castle.

His next film, crime drama Brother (1997) about a contract killer, was a great box-office and critical success. The film featured music by the band Nautilus Pompilus for which Balabanov directed several music videos prior. It was screened at the Cannes Film Festival in 1997. It was a breakthrough film for Balabanov and the lead actor Sergei Bodrov Jr., making them instantly known throughout Russia. The success of the movie led to the creation of the sequel, Brother 2, also directed by Balabanov and starring Bodrov. The film is set in Chicago.

He directed Of Freaks and Men in 1998 about the emerging pornography business in turn of the century Imperial Russia. The film premiered at the Directors' Fortnight of 1998 Cannes Film Festival.

Dead Man's Bluff (2005) was Balabanov's first foray into dark comedy.

Cargo 200 (2007), partially based on Faulkner's novel Sanctuary, proved to be controversial among critics and audiences due to the graphic display of violence in the film. Cannes Film Festival programmer Joël Chapron likened the picture to a "snuff film" at the Sochi Film Festival premiere.

Aleksei Balabanov's last completed film was Me Too which was screened at the Venice Film Festival in 2012.

Personal life
He was married to costume designer Nadezhda Vasilyeva. He had two sons.

Death

Balabanov struggled to cope with the death of his favoured actor and close friend Sergei Bodrov Jr. In 2002 and after Bodrov's death, Balabanov's alcohol consumption increased considerably. Balabanov died on 18 May 2013 of a heart attack.

Balabanov was buried near his father's grave at Smolensky Cemetery in St. Petersburg."

Unfinished works

Prior to his death, Balabanov was reportedly planning to make a film on Stalin, portraying him as a 'godfather of crime'."

Legacy

Largely due to the popularity of Brother and Brother 2, Balabanov enjoys a legendary status in Russia, and is frequently cited as one of Russia's greatest ever film directors.

Literature
Florian Weinhold (2013), Path of Blood: The Post-Soviet Gangster, His Mistress and Their Others in Aleksei Balabanov's Genre Films, Reaverlands Books: North Charleston, SC.

Filmography
Me Too (Я тоже хочу) (2012) – Aleksei Balabanov was awarded the "Best Director" award for this film at the Saint Petersburg International Film Festival
A Stoker (Кочегар) (2010)Morphine (Морфий) (2008)Cargo 200 (Груз 200) (2007)It Doesn't Hurt Me (Мне не больно) (2006)Zhmurki (Жмурки) (2005)War (Война) (2002)
 The River (Река) (2002)Brother 2 (Брат 2) (2000)Of Freaks and Men (Про уродов и людей) (1998)Brother (Брат) (1997)Pribytiye poyezda (1995) (segment "Trofim")The Castle (Замок) (1994)
Border conflict ( Пограничный конфликт) (1991)Happy Days (Счастливые дни) (1991)From the History of Aerostatics in Russia (О воздушном летании в России) (1990)Nastya and Yegor (Настя и Егор) (1989)I don't have a friend or One step beyond (У меня нет друга, или One step beyond) (1988)There used to be another time (Раньше было другое время) (1987)

 Music videos 
Balabanov directed several music videos:

 Three clips for the band Nautilus Pompilius: "A glimpse from the screen" (1988), "Pure demon" (1992), and "In the rain" (1997; soundtrack to his movie Brother);
 A clip for : "Stratosphere" (1989);
 Together with the director Valery Makushchenko, a clip for the band Bi-2'': "No One Writes to the Colonel" (2000; soundtrack to his film Brother 2).

See also 

Sergei Bodrov, Jr.
Viktor Sukhorukov

References

External links

 Biography of Aleksei Balabanov 
Program for Crime and Transcendence: The Films of Aleksei Balabanov (Yale University, Spring 2015)
MacKay, John. "Balabanov's BROTHER (1997): Cinema as salvage operation." 
MacKay, John. "Balabanov's HAPPY DAYS (1991): Beckett via Realism." 

1959 births
2013 deaths
Mass media people from Yekaterinburg
Russian film directors
Russian film editors
Russian screenwriters
Male screenwriters
Russian male writers
High Courses for Scriptwriters and Film Directors alumni
Recipients of the Nika Award
Deaths from coronary artery disease